His eldest son, Rafa'at wa Awal-i-Martabat Raja Sri Balwant Singh Sahib Bahadur [1], succeeded his father as Raja of Kaswar and Nazim of Benares in 1738. Leading a much more martial life, he built a fort and established a capital at Gangapur, but later moved to Ramnagar. In 1751, he expelled the representative of the Nawab of Awadh in an attempt to carve out a principality at Benares, but had to retreat strategically after a fierce direct fight when the Nawab invaded his domain in March 1752; but continued his guerrilla fight and ultimately the Nawab stooped to accept his terms. Resultantly a settlement was made between the two and he was restored to his titles by the Nawab. Emperor Alamgir II granted him a jagir in Bihar two years later. The first to start a tradition of fighting with the East India Company which continued till the formation of India, he joined Shah Alam and Shuja ud-Daula in their 1763 invasion of Bengal. Following the Battle of Buxar in 1764, Emperor Shah Alam back stabbed him and transferred Balwant Singh's zamindari to the company, but the Company refused it along with the treaty of benares signed by the Emperor the same year. Instead, the zamindari reverted once again to the Nawab of Awadh in 1765, but the actual control remained with the Maharaja. This took place five years before Maharaja Balwant Singh's death in 1770. He is also called as the Shivaji of North India.

Balwant Singh was succeeded by his son Rafa'at wa Awal-i-Martabat Chait Singh Sahib Bahadur.

References

Maharajas of Benares
 1711 births
 1770 deaths
 Narayan dynasty